Robert Kloster (8 March 1905 – 7 February 1979) was a Norwegian museum director and art historian.

Family
He was born in Bergen as a son of physician Robert Emil Kloster (1873–1947) and Alette "Ada" Falsen Wiesener (1873–1948).

In April 1932 in Paris he married Wibecke Trane Kielland (1902–1992), a daughter of Jonas Schanche Kielland and sister of Thor Bendz Kielland.

Career
He finished his secondary education in 1924, and graduated with the mag.art. degree (PhD equivalent) from the University of Oslo in 1929. He worked in Stavanger Museum from 1929, then in the department of cultural history at Bergen Museum from 1932. He took the doctorate in 1943 with the thesis Snekkerhåndverket i Bergen under renessansen. He was the museum director of Vestlandske Kunstindustrimuseum from 1949 to 1964. He also chaired the organization Norske Museers Landsforbund, a forerunner of Norges Museumsforbund, from 1949 to 1957, and the Society for the Preservation of Ancient Norwegian Monuments in Bergen from 1949 to 1960. From 1964 to his retirement he was a professor at the University of Bergen.

He was a member of the Norwegian Academy of Science and Letters from 1948, held an honorary degree at the University of Aberdeen and was the praeses of Det nyttige Selskab from 1965 to 1976. He was decorated as a Knight, First Class of the Royal Norwegian Order of St. Olav in 1954, and as a Knight of the Icelandic Order of the Falcon and a Chevalier of the Legion of Honour.

References

1905 births
1979 deaths
Curators from Bergen
University of Oslo alumni
Academic staff of the University of Bergen
Norwegian art historians
Directors of museums in Norway
Members of the Norwegian Academy of Science and Letters
Knights of the Order of the Falcon
Chevaliers of the Légion d'honneur
20th-century Norwegian historians